Screen Cartoonist's Guild (SCG) was an American labor union formed in 1938 in Los Angeles, California. The SCG was formed in the aftermath of protests at Van Beuren Studios and Fleischer Studios, and represented workers and resolved issues at major American animation studios such as Walt Disney Productions.

Prehistory
The onset of the Great Depression in 1929 as well as bank holidays enacted by Franklin D. Roosevelt in 1933 made it impossible for Wall Street investors to supply the major Hollywood film studios with the cash flow they needed. Studio executives cut salaries for their employees but took no cuts for themselves, leading to a mass spree of unionization in Hollywood. The executives retaliated by firing union members and picketers at a steady rate.

In Hollywood, animators were originally unionized under the International Alliance of Theatrical Stage Employees in 1914. Noticing that there was not a union to solely represent animators, Bill Nolan unsuccessfully tried to form such a union in 1925, and a group formed by Grim Natwick, Shamus Culhane, and Al Eugster in 1932 was disbanded after executives began to threaten its employees and many members lost their jobs.

In New York City, where studio unions were generally better off, Bill Littlejohn, along with Hicks Lokey, John McManus, and Jim Tyer, formed the Unemployed Artists Association, which became the Commercial Artists and Designers Union (CADU) due to Roosevelt's policies, and later the Animated Motion Picture Worker's Union (AMPWU). These two unions were the most immediately approached in New York when employees were mistreated.

Van Beuren protest
In 1935, Van Beuren Studios fired Sadie Bodin, an inker and scene planner, for pro-union sentiment, though she argued the Wagner Act prevented them from doing so. Van Beuren ordered employees to take unpaid overtime or risk being fired, and supervisor Burt Gillett treated them very poorly, having fired Bodin to replace her with someone "whose attitude was better". Bodin and her husband responded by protesting, becoming the first people to picket an animation studio.

Inspired by Bodin's protest, the AMPWU brought legal action against Van Beuren, but lost. Gillett subsequently fired union members and had them blacklisted so that they could never regain work.

Fleischer strike

Bodin's strike led key Van Beuren employees to leave for Fleischer Studios. The studio gave poor wages but generous bonuses and threw extravagant parties, though Max Fleischer's controlling behavior offended immigrant workers who had escaped dictatorships. When artist Dan Glass died due to poor working conditions, the CADU blamed his death on Fleischer and began protesting outside the studio. Fleischer retaliated by firing union sympathizers and quoting sentiment from anti-union employees in print.

At Fleischer, the first coordinated strike at an animation studio began in 1937 after the company fired thirteen pro-union employees. The strike lasted several months before Fleischer's partner Paramount Pictures intervened and demanded they sign a contract with the CADU. This led to better working conditions and a paid week of vacation, as well as holidays and screen credits, and previously fired employees were re-hired.

Founding
The events at Van Beuren and Fleischer led to the formation of the SCG in 1938, with Littlejohn as president. Herbert Sorrell later became president in 1941. The SCG became a chapter of the Conference of Studio Unions and was awarded jurisdiction over all matters pertaining to animation studios by the National Labor Relations Board.

History and impact
The SCG was joined throughout its life by animators from Van Beuren and Fleischer (and its successor, Famous Studios), as well as Leon Schlesinger Productions (later Warner Bros. Cartoons), the Metro-Goldwyn-Mayer cartoon studio, and the Screen Gems cartoon studio, all of whom it secured contracts with.

The SCG was instrumental in the strike at Walt Disney Productions in 1941. Studio head Walt Disney fired Art Babbitt for being a member of the SCG, prompting more than 200 employees to go on strike. The strike resulted in half the studio's employees leaving for other studios, such as David Hilberman and John Hubley, who formed United Productions of America. Disney himself was left with a permanent distrust of pro-union employees, and blamed Babbitt among others for the strike.

The SCG was succeeded by The Animation Guild, I.A.T.S.E. Local 839, which still exists today.

References

International Alliance of Theatrical Stage Employees
American animation
Trade unions established in 1938